Alain Townsend  is a Professor of Medicine in the Weatherall Institute of Molecular Medicine at Oxford University. His laboratory studies virology, mainly influenza, but more recently ebola.

After graduating from St Mary's Hospital, London, he went to the National Institute for Medical Research to study immunology. He received his PhD in 1984, supervised by Brigitte Askonas.

Awards 
 1989 William B. Coley Award 
 1992 Fellow of the Royal Society
 1992 Louis-Jeantet Prize for Medicine (1992) 
 2000 Gairdner Foundation International Award

References 

Year of birth missing (living people)
Living people
British immunologists
Howard Hughes Medical Investigators
Fellows of the Royal Society
Fellows of Linacre College, Oxford
Fellows of New College, Oxford